Events from the year 1837 in Russia

 The Winter Palace is destroyed by fire.

Incumbents
 Monarch – Nicholas I

Events

 
 
  
  
 
 
  Ministry of State Property
 Tsarskoye Selo Railway

 Fire in the Winter Palace

Births

Deaths

 29 January - Alexander Pushkin, poet, dies in duel (born 1799)

References

1837 in Russia
Years of the 19th century in the Russian Empire